Gnorm Gnat was an American gag-a-day comic strip by Jim Davis based on fictional insects, with the primary focus on a gnat named Gnorm. The strip appeared in The Pendleton Times in Pendleton, Indiana (and would be the only newspaper to publish the strip), from 1973 to 1975, but failure to take the character to mainstream success led Davis to instead create the comic strip Garfield. Mike Peters, the cartoonist for Mother Goose and Grimm, has said that Gnorm Gnat is now a part of "cartoon folklore" as a failure that paved the way for major success.

History
Davis developed the idea for the strip while assisting cartoonist Tom Ryan on his Tumbleweeds strip. Davis saw the possibilities for gags with insect characters, and the strip was adopted by The Pendleton Times starting in early 1973. However, Davis also approached syndicates to publish Gnorm Gnat and was rejected.  According to writers Mark Acey and Scott Nickel, Davis would receive rejections for Gnorm Gnat for years.  "I thought bugs were funny, and nobody else did", Davis would later tell the press.

Davis also recounted that one editor had advised him that "Your art is good, your gags are great, but bugs—nobody can relate to bugs!" Davis took the advice to heart and then turned to Garfield.  Some in the media have also reported that Davis had become "bored with the strip." Another reporter suggested that the notion that no one can relate to insects has been disproved by some jokes in the comic strip The Far Side by Gary Larson.

For years, it was believed that last-ever published strip of Gnorm Gnat was Gnorm Gnat meeting his demise by being stepped on by the foot of a human, Monty Python-style. This was later debunked after a Google Drive document containing many editions of The Pendleton Times that included Gnorm Gnat comics was uploaded in 2019, with the actual final strip (published on Christmas Day 1975) just having the protagonist thank the fans who stuck with the strips while standing next to the message Merry Christmas with Gnorm saying "Thanks, Pendleton." The document also contained some strips for Davis' next work, Jon, a prototype to what would become Garfield, which debuted in the Times on January 8, 1976, two weeks after Gnorm Gnat ended (it was renamed Garfield on August 1, 1977).

Legacy
Garfield would later become accepted for national distribution by United Feature Syndicate in 1978 (the strip ended its run in the Times on March 2, and made its national debut on June 19 that year) and became a worldwide success. In 1992, one Garfield book called Garfield Takes His Licks referred to Gnorm as an in-joke. Gnorm Gnat was listed as #2 among the "Top Ten Comic Strips Jim Davis Tried Before Garfield", being placed behind "Garfield the Toaster" and above "Milt the Incontinent Hamster." In 1997, one Garfield comic strip featured a fly talking to a spider; Davis alluded to Gnorm Gnat by commenting that, "After nearly 30 years, I finally got a bug strip published".

However, Davis's fellow-cartoonist Mike Peters looked back on Gnorm Gnat in an unfavorable way.  Peters claimed, "We can always be thankful that Jim's first strip never made it... Gnorm Gnat has gone down in cartoon folklore as a most fortunate failure. Can you imagine a bright orange gnat on every car window? A great, huge gnat for the Thanksgiving Day Parade. A big fat gnat saying 'I hate Tuesdays.'"

Characters
The characters of Gnorm Gnat were meant to be presented in a "simple, humorous style" of appearance. Davis displays the characters and describes them in the book 20 Years & Still Kicking!: Garfield's Twentieth Anniversary Collection.
Gnorm Gnat is a gnat who Davis says plays the "straight man" who sometimes behaves like the character Walter Mitty. 
Lyman is an insect with buck teeth who wears a hat. He is supposed to be insane. Davis later named a character after him in Garfield.
Dr. Gougo is an unspecified insect who acts as an incompetent medical practitioner. He speaks in a broken German accent.
Freddy is a fruit fly who has one week to live.
Natasha is a beautiful insect whom Gnorm has a crush on.
Dr. Rosenwurm is a worm who is highly intelligent.
Cecil Slug is a slug merely described as a stupid character.
Drac Webb is a villainous spider who eats other characters, typically by trapping them in webs. 
Wench Webb is Drac Webb's wife and a "source of many Bickerson-type discussions". She is one of only two female characters in the strip.

References

American comics characters
Comics about animals
Comics characters introduced in 1972
1972 comics debuts
1975 comics endings
Gag-a-day comics
Fictional insects
Indiana culture
Pendleton, Indiana
Jim Davis (cartoonist)